Khairul Imam Zakiri (born 19 December 2001) is an Indonesian professional footballer who plays as an attacking midfielder or winger for Liga 1 club Persita Tangerang.

Club career

Persita Tangerang
He was signed for Persita Tangerang to play in Liga 1 in the 2022 season. Zakiri made his league debut on 14 September 2022 in a match against PSIS Semarang at the Indomilk Arena, Tangerang.

Career statistics

Club

Notes

Honours

International 
Indonesia U-19
 AFF U-19 Youth Championship third place: 2019

References

External links
 Imam Zakiri at Soccerway
 Imam Zakiri at Liga Indonesia

2001 births
Living people
Sportspeople from Jakarta
Indonesian footballers
Liga 1 (Indonesia) players
Persita Tangerang players
Association football midfielders